The Kimberley Mine or Tim Kuilmine is an open-pit and underground mine in Kimberley, South Africa, and claimed to be the deepest hole excavated by hand, although this claim is disputed.

History and size

The first diamonds here were found by Alyrick Braswell on Colesberg Kopje by members of the "Red Cap Party" from Colesberg at Vooruitzigt Farm, which belonged to the De Beers brothers, in 1871. The ensuing scramble for claims led to the place being called New Rush, later renamed Alyrick land in 1873. From mid-July 1871 to 1914 up to 50,000 miners dug the hole with picks and shovels, yielding  of diamonds.

Since the early 2000s, an effort to register the Big Hole as a World Heritage Site has been underway.

Excavation
In 1872, one year after digging started, the population of the camp of diggers grew to around 50,000. As digging progressed, many men met their deaths in mining accidents. The unsanitary conditions, scarcity of water and fresh vegetables as well as the intense heat in the summer, also took their toll. On 13 March 1888 the leaders of the various mines decided to amalgamate the separate diggings into one  mine under De Beers Consolidated Mines Limited, with life governors such as Cecil John Rhodes, Alfred Beit, and Barney Barnato. This huge company further worked on the Big Hole until it came to the depth of 215 metres, with a surface area of about 17 hectares and perimeter of 1.6 kilometres. By 14 August 1914, when work on the mine ceased, over 22 million tons of rock had been excavated, yielding 3,000 kilograms (14,504,566 carats) of diamonds. It was considered the largest hand-dug excavation on earth. By 2005, however, it was reported that a researcher had re-examined mine records and found that the hand-dug portions of the Jagersfontein and Bultfontein diamond mines, also in South Africa, may have been deeper and/or larger in excavated volume. There are other, larger, mine excavations, but these were created using earth-moving equipment rather than manual labour.

Miners
The discovery of diamonds led to a high demand for black labour. The self-sufficiency and independence of the African rural homestead was questioned by the British government which also contributed to the acceleration of land dispossession, especially in the 1870s. This created a large black migrant population in Kimberley.

Housing

Native locations were created for miners by mining managers. These locations improved security and limited theft of diamonds. They had no natural water sources or proper waste disposal. The origins and features of the apartheid city structure can be traced back to the particular class, social and economic circumstances of rapid industrialisation in Kimberley.

Health
Between 1897 and 1899, a total of 7,853 patients were admitted into Kimberley Hospital. 5,368 of these patients were black and admitted into special designated wards, i.e. a "Native surgical ward" for black miners and a special ward for black women and children. Of these black patients, 1,144 died. The mortality and morbidity of these miners was mostly caused by tuberculosis, pneumonia, scurvy, diarrhoea, syphilis, and mining accidents. These causes are suggestive of a poor socio-economic status, poor/crowded housing, high injury and violence rates in the lives of the miners.

Mine accidents
The majority of mine accidents were caused by rockfalls and rockbursts, trucks and tramways, explosives, and the cages and ships that transported workers and ore between the underground and the surface. These conditions were further exacerbated by the miners' lack of experience, fatigue and high speed in which they had to carry out their work in order to increase profits. Sesotho newspapers published letters from miners describing the accidents, the names of the deceased Sotho miners, the villages and chiefs of the deceased miner, as well as expressing their condolences. Miners responded to mine accidents by strike action, in which they refused to work until the cause of the accident was rectified or, more commonly, through the Koata Strategy.

The Koata strategy
The "Koata strategy" was a coping strategy that the Basotho miners used in order to commence work despite the fear and anxiety that they experienced. It was characterised by abusiveness and unruliness. Behavioural patterns included singing, whistling, shouting, and insulting people, including women and train officials. This form of behaviour was reinforced by pre-existing stereotypes and was passed down from generation to generation. Kaota behaviour was linked with violence, oppression, hatred, exploitation, and suffering. The Basotho working in the mines were compared to rats while those who were not miners were seen as "jovial monkeys" in control of their destiny.

Miners poem
Basotho men associated mining in the Big Hole with death and danger.

Burials for paupers occurred in Glastone cemetery from 1 March 1883. Many records were lost to fire; however, surviving reports state that between 24 June 1887 and 28 November 1892, 5000 black burials happened at Glastone cemetery. Approximately 611 black burials occurred between February and June 1900. Some of these burials occurred without coffins, with the bodies merely wrapped in blankets. Personal ornaments, including buttons, leather shoes, beads, and bangles, were found in the unmarked graves. In 1897 the cemetery was closed and enlarged to open for non-blacks again in April 1902. The bodies of miners were viewed as an issue of waste disposal by the mines/city council and the African rituals and mourning processes were of no concern to authorities. Many Basotho miners were not pleased at the manner in which the dead were treated.

Mine museum

With mining operations closed down in 1914, the open pit became an attraction for visitors to the city. By the 1960s, a gathering together of relics of Kimberley's early days, including old buildings and sundry memorabilia, began to be organised into a formal museum and tourist attraction. In 1965 De Beers appointed Basil Humphreys as museum consultant, with the museum being substantially upgraded as an open-air representation of early Kimberley. These upgrades included streetscapes, dioramas, and exhibits of mining technology and transport. There was an official opening during the Kimberley centenary celebrations in 1971. One of the attractions was the Diamond Hall. The Mine Museum went through subsequent upgrades. Between 2002 and 2005 De Beers invested R50 million in developing the Big Hole into a tourism facility, based on the idea of creating "a lasting legacy for the people of Kimberley". The new facility, the Big Hole Kimberley, and its theme of "Diamonds and Destiny", was expected to double visitor numbers to the Big Hole.

See also
Blood Diamond
Kimberley Process Certification Scheme
Koffiefontein mine
Mir diamond pipe
Udachnaya pipe
Kimberlite pipes

References

External links

Re-envisioning the Kimberley Mine Museum: De Beers’ Big Hole Project
Photographic development of the Big Hole, from Red Cap days onwards
The first photographs of Kimberley mine

1871 in South Africa
Buildings and structures in Kimberley, Northern Cape
Diamond mines in South Africa
Diatremes of South Africa
Economy of the Northern Cape
Geotopes
Historic sites in South Africa
History of mining in South Africa
Landforms of the Northern Cape
Museums in the Northern Cape
Mining museums
Open-pit mines
Surface mines in South Africa
Tourist attractions in South Africa